Louis de Pardaillan de Gondrin (9 November 1707 – 9 December 1743), Duke of Antin, was a French courtier, freemason and male-line great-grandson of Madame de Montespan.

Biography
He was born at Versailles in 1707 to Louis de Pardaillan de Gondrin, marquis de Gondrin, and his wife, Marie Victoire de Noailles, one of the 20 children of Anne Jules de Noailles and Marie Françoise de Bournonville. His father was a member of the House of Pardaillan de Gondrin, an old noble family of Gascon origin. His maternal cousins included the Duke of Noailles (who married Madame de Maintenon's heiress) and the Duke of La Vallière.

The elder of two children, Louis was known as the marquis de Gondrin from 1712 when his father died unexpectedly at the age of 23. In 1722, his grandfather, Louis Antoine, the only legitimate son of Madame de Montespan, resigned the Duchy of Antin and gave it to his grandson who was fifteen at the time. On 29 October 1722, he married Françoise Gillonne de Montmorency (1704–1768), a granddaughter of François Henri de Montmorency, Duke of Luxembourg and Marshal of France. The couple had four children, one son (born in 1727) and three daughters. His son never married and died in Breme during the Seven Years' War. His youngest daughter married into the Uzès family, one of the most senior peers in France, ranking immediately after the Princes of the Blood (legitimate male-line descendants of the ruling House of Bourbon).

Louis's mother was remarried on 2 February 1723 to Louis Alexandre de Bourbon, Count of Toulouse, the youngest child of Louis XIV and Louis's great-grandmother La Montespan, in a secret ceremony. The marriage was announced only after the death of the Régent in December of the same year. As such, his half-brother was Louis Jean Marie de Bourbon, the duc de Penthièvre and single richest man in France prior to the revolution. His nephews included the prince de Lamballe (husband of the murdered Maria Teresa Luisa of Savoy).

He died at the age of 36 and was succeeded as Duke of Antin by his only son Louis. His wife outlived him by 25 years.

Issue

Julie Sophie Gillette de Pardaillan de Gondrin (1 October 1725–1797), Abbess of Fontevraud (1765–1792), never married;
Louis de Pardaillan de Gondrin (15 February 1727–14 September 1757), died unmarried;
Marie Françoise de Pardaillan de Gondrin (13 August 1728–1764), married François Emery de Durfort, Count of Civrac, had issue;
Julie Magdeleine Victoire de Pardaillan de Gondrin (20 March 1731–13 September 1799), married François Emmanuel de Crussol, Duke of Uzès and had issue; present Dukes of Uzès descend from Julie.

Ancestry

References and notes

1707 births
1743 deaths
18th-century peers of France
Louis
French nobility
Louis
People from Versailles
French Freemasons